Proline rich 5 like is a protein that in humans is encoded by the PRR5L gene.

References

Further reading 

Human proteins